Fred Martin Torrey  (January 29, 1884 – July 1967) American sculptor known for his monuments and architectural sculpture. His wife, Mabel Torrey (1886–1974) was also a recognized sculptor who worked with her husband on some commissions.

Selected works
 1st Company Massachusetts Sharpshooters Monument, Gettysburg Battlefield, Gettysburg, Pennsylvania   (1913)
 333 North Michigan Avenue Building, architectural sculpture, Chicago, Illinois,  (1929)
 Heald Square Monument  Chicago, Following sculptor Lorado Taft’s 1936 death, the sculpture that he had been  commissioned to create was completed by his associates Leonard Crunelle,  Nellie Walker and Fred Torrey.
 Abraham Lincoln Walks at Midnight, at the West Virginia State Capitol

References

1884 births
1967 deaths
American architectural sculptors
American male sculptors
20th-century American sculptors
20th-century American male artists